The Volvo BZL is a full-size zero-emission battery electric bus chassis for both single-decker buses and double-decker buses manufactured by Volvo since 2021.

The BZL Electric range was launched in September 2021, with the first right-hand drive examples being built as demonstrators for the UK and Ireland market with double-decker and single-decker bodies by MCV Bus & Coach. The chassis range features  heat pump-powered heating and ventilation, and is claimed to be 90% recyclable. It is also built to a high safety standard with multiple new safety innovations such as sealed battery compartments and a strengthened front frame. Metroline have received the double-deck demonstrator built to Transport for London specification, which they plan to evaluate alongside other battery electric London buses.

Orders

The first Volvo BZLs for the United Kingdom were delivered to Stagecoach West Scotland, with deliveries for 25 MCV-bodied single-deck BZLs for use in Ayrshire commencing in February 2023. Stagecoach East are also to receive 30 double-deck BZLs, ordered in October 2022 for service in Cambridge. 48 MCV-bodied single-deck BZLs specified to 9.7m, 10.35m and 10.8m lengths have also been ordered by Metroline, with delivery planned for the second half of 2023. Demonstrators have entered service with Lothian Buses in Edinburgh and Stagecoach South in Winchester.

In Australia, a BZL with a Volgren Optimus single-decker body designed for the Australia and New Zealand market was unveiled in October 2021 at Volvo's Australian headquarters in Brisbane. The first four Volgren-bodied BZLs entered service with the Western Australia Public Transport Authority in the suburbs of Perth between February and March 2022, while 17 will service with Transdev Queensland beginning February 2023. A BZL will also be demonstrated in Colombia over a period of six months.

In Singapore, a Volvo BZL with a three-door SC Neustar City body was unveiled in November 2022, developed in joint partnership between Volvo and local bus and coach bodywork manufacturer SC Auto. The bus is to enter service on trial with Land Transport Authority operators by the end of 2022.

References

External links

Volvo BZL official website

Battery electric buses
Low-floor buses
Vehicles introduced in 2021
BZL